Jacob Carl Fey (born 1949) is an American politician serving as a member of the Washington House of Representatives, representing the 27th district. A member of the Democratic Party, Fey assumed office on January 14, 2013.

Early life and education 
Fey was born and raised in Port Angeles, Washington. He earned a Bachelor of Arts in political science from the University of Washington and a Master of Public Administration from the University of Puget Sound.

Career 
Fey served as the director of the Washington State University Energy program from 2001 to 2019. He also served as a member of the Sound Transit and Pierce Transit boards. Fey was a member of the Tacoma City Council and served as deputy mayor of Tacoma, Washington. Fey is a progressive.

Awards 
 2021 City Champion Awards. Presented by Association of Washington Cities (AWC).

References

Democratic Party members of the Washington House of Representatives
Living people
21st-century American politicians
1949 births